Gregor von Helmersen or Grigory Petrovich Helmersen (– ) was a Baltic German geologist.

Biography

Helmersen was born in Duckershof, Livonia (now in Estonia) and went to boarding school in St. Petersburg. He graduated from the University of Dorpat in 1825 and joined the finance ministry. He accompanied Alexander von Humboldt into the Orenburg region and was recommended, along with E.K. Hoffman, by the minister E.F. Kankrin to be sent for higher education. The two travelled and listened to lectures in the universities of Berlin, Heidelberg, and Bonn. In 1835 he was put in the Corps of Mining Engineers and in 1838 he became professor of geology in the Mining Institute at Saint Petersburg of which he was also director.

In 1839, along with Karl Ernst von Baer, he founded the first serial natural scientific publication in Russia known as Beiträge zur Kenntniss des Russischen Reiches.

In 1850, he became an academician of the Russian Academy of Sciences in St Petersburg. He founded and became the first head of the Russian Geological Committee in 1882.

He was an author of numerous memoirs on the geology of Russia, especially on coal and other mineral deposits of the country; and he wrote also some explanations to accompany separate sheets of the geological map of Russia.

His geological work was continued to an advanced age, one of the later publications being Studien über die Wanderblöcke und die Diluvialgebilde Russlands (1869 and 1882). Most of his memoirs were published by the Imperial Academy of Sciences at Saint Petersburg.

See also
List of Baltic German scientists

References

External links
Kammeri Manor, birthplace of Gregor von Helmersen at Estonian Manors Portal

1803 births
1885 deaths
People from Kambja Parish
People from Kreis Dorpat
Baltic-German people
19th-century geologists
Estonian explorers
Estonian geologists
German explorers
19th-century German geologists
Cartographers from the Russian Empire
Saint Petersburg Mining University alumni
Founding members of the Russian Geographical Society
Full members of the Saint Petersburg Academy of Sciences
Demidov Prize laureates
Burials at Raadi cemetery